Apostel may refer to:

People
 Hans Erich Apostel (1901–1972), German-born Austrian composer
 Henryk Apostel (1941– ), Polish footballer
 Leo Apostel (1925–1995), Belgian philosopher

Other
 6710 Apostel, asteroid
 Apostel, play by Andreas Latzko